Maronina is a genus of fungi in the  family Lecanoraceae.

The genus name of Maronina is in honour of Nicoló Marogna (1573-1643), who was an Italian teacher, Apothecary and botanist from Verona.

The genus was circumscribed by Josef Hafellner and Roderick Westgarth Rogers in Biblioth. Lichenol. vol.38 on page 100 in 1990.

References

Lecanoraceae
Lecanorales genera
Taxa named by Josef Hafellner